Club Ghazir is a professional volleyball team  based in Ghazir, Lebanon. It plays in the Lebanese Volleyball League. It has won two times the Lebanese Volleyball League (2003, 2004), and the Lebanese Volleyball Cup twice (1993, 2003). The current president is Jean Hammam.

Achievements
Lebanese Volleyball League (2)
 Winner: 2003, 2004
 2nd place: 1996, 1997, 1998, 1999, 2000, 2001
 Lebanese Volleyball Cup (2)
 Winner: 1993, 2003
 Arab Championship
 Fourth Place: 18th Arab Championship (Morocco, 1999), 21st Arab Championship (Lebanon 2002)
 Asian Championship
 Fifth Place: 9th Asian Championship (Lebanon, 1997), 10th Asian Championship (Lebanon, 1998), 11th Asian Championship (Thailand, 1999)

Notes

External links
 Lebanese Volleyball Official Website

Sports teams in Lebanon
Lebanese volleyball clubs
Volleyball clubs established in 1965
1965 establishments in Lebanon